J. Barry Mason (born March 24, 1941) is an American academic. He served as acting president of University of Alabama from 2002 to 2003. Mason was also the dean of the University of Alabama’s Culverhouse College of Commerce and Business Administration. He attended Louisiana Tech University where he earned his bachelor's degrees, and then later attended the University of Alabama where he earned his master's and PhD degrees.

References

Presidents of the University of Alabama
Louisiana Tech University alumni
1941 births
Living people
People from Memphis, Tennessee